Events from the year 1714 in Sweden

Incumbents
 Monarch – Charles XII

Events

 9 February - Russian victory at the Battle of Storkyro. As a result, all of Finland fell under Russian military occupation for the rest of the war, a seven-year period of hardship known in Finland as the Great Wrath.
 7 August - Battle of Gangut
 - Creation of the Stockholm County.
  
 
 
 

 - The Anna Jöransdotter case.

Births

 9 January - Elisabeth Stierncrona, writer (died 1769) 
 
  21 April - Anna Maria Hilfeling, miniaturist  (died 1783) 
 
 31 October - Hedvig Taube, royal mistress (died 1744) 
 25 December - Israel Acrelius, priest (died 1800)

Deaths

 17 April – Haquin Spegel, author and hymn writer  (born 1645) 
 19 April – Cornelius Anckarstierna, admiral   (born 1655) 
 
 
  – Hedvig Eleonora Stenbock, courtier  (born 1658)

References

 
Years of the 18th century in Sweden
Sweden